Jean-Marie Drot (2 March 1929 – 23 September 2015) was a French writer and documentary maker.

Biography
Drot was born in Nancy, Meurthe-et-Moselle. He was the director of the French Academy in Rome from 1985 to 1994. Drot and Giovanni Pieraccini, an Italian socialist politician, founded an organization, RomaEuropa, which initiated the Romaeuropa Festival, a cultural festival. Drot is noted for his documentary work on Montparnasse.

Publications 
 Le Retour d'Ulysse manchot, éd. Julliard 1990
 Femme Lumière, éd. Deleatur 2000
 Dictionnaire vagabond, éd. Plon 2003
 Femmes hostie, éd. Gallilée 2006

Films 
 Les heures chaudes de Montparnasse (The hot hours in Montparnasse), Documentary series filmed in 1962 then presented in a new cut in 1987. 
 Jeu d'echecs avec Marcel Duchamp (Games of Chess with Marcel Duchamp), Documentary filmed in 1963.
 Journal de voyage avec André Malraux (Journal of a journey with André Malraux), Documentary series of 13 episodes of 52 minutes, produced 1974–1975. 
 Un homme parmi les hommes : Alberto Giacometti (A man among men : Alberto Giacometti)

References

This page is a translation of :fr:Jean-Marie Drot.

1929 births
2015 deaths
Writers from Nancy, France
French documentary filmmakers
French male writers
Lycée Louis-le-Grand alumni
École Normale Supérieure alumni
Mass media people from Nancy, France